Young Oceans is a Christian art-rock recording project from Brooklyn, New York.  The project originated as a collective of artists affiliated with Trinity Grace Church in greater New York City recording songs by songwriter Eric Marshall. Songs originally written for church gatherings were recorded by members of the band and their producer Mike Beck.

Members
Current members
 Eric Marshall
 Mike Beck
 Mason Ingram
 Rob Ritchie
 Matt Basile
 Brian Sanders
 Kanene Pipkin
 Nicole Pietrini Ingram

Discography
Studio albums
 Young Oceans (April 3, 2012, Street Talk Media)
 Advent (Deluxe) (March 5, 2013, Street Talk Media)
 I Must Find You (September 30, 2014, Street Talk Media)
 Voices, Vol. I (April 8, 2016, Street Talk Media)
 Suddenly (Or The Nuclear Sunburst of the Truth Revealed) (October 20, 2017, Street Talk Media)
 Among the Ruins (Original Soundtrack - Live) (November 2019, Street Talk Media
 Songs of Christmas (December 2019, Street Talk Media)
 You Are Fullness 1 and 2 (late 2020)
 Subjects in Motion (late 2022)

EPs
 Advent (December 2, 2012, Street Talk Media)

References

External links
Official website

Musical groups from Brooklyn
2012 establishments in New York City
Musical groups established in 2012
American Christian rock groups
Alternative rock groups from New York (state)